Michael J. McCarthy (October 23, 1890 – June 12, 1955) was an American politician who was a member of the Massachusetts House of Representatives and Massachusetts Commissioner of Veterans' Services.

McCarthy was born on October 23, 1890 in East Bridgewater, Massachusetts. He spent his entire life in the town. He was a member of its board of selectmen for 19 years and town clerk for 21. From 1943 to 1955, McCarthy represented the 5th Plymouth District in the Massachusetts House of Representatives. In 1954 he was the Republican nominee for Massachusetts Secretary of the Commonwealth. He lost to incumbent Edward J. Cronin 56% to 43%. In January 1955, McCarthy was appointed Commissioner of Veterans' Services by Governor Christian A. Herter. McCarthy died on June 12, 1955 at his home.

See also
 Massachusetts legislature: 1943–1944, 1945–1946, 1947–1948, 1949–1950, 1951–1952, 1953–1954

References

1890 births
1955 deaths
20th-century American politicians
Republican Party members of the Massachusetts House of Representatives
People from East Bridgewater, Massachusetts
Massachusetts Secretaries of Veterans' Services